Heading for the East was recorded in 1990 by the German power metal band Gamma Ray following the release of their album Heading for Tomorrow.

Release Date: 1990 (VHS), 2003 (DVD), 2015 (CD)
Recorded live: 1990
Cover: Henni Hell
Photography: Götz Kühnemund / Boggie Kopac
Producer: Peter Ernst
Executive Producer: Mike Smith
Director: Steve Payne
Running Time: approximately 90:00

Track listing
"Opening Titles"
"Lust For Life"
"Heaven Can Wait"
"Space Eater"
"Band Documentary"
"Freetime"
"Who Do You Think You Are"
"The Silence"
"Save Us"
"Band Interview"
"I Want Out"
"Ride The Sky"
"Documentary"
"Hold Your Ground"
"Money"
"Band Interview 2"
"Heading For Tomorrow"
"End Credits"

DVD-Extra
Introduction and track-by-track audio review from journalist Malcolm Dome.

Personnel
 Ralf Scheepers - vocals
 Kai Hansen - vocals, guitar
 Dirk Schlächter - guitar, bass, backing vocals
 Uwe Wessel - bass, guitar, backing vocals
 Uli Kusch - drums, backing vocals
 Jorn Ellerbrock – keyboards, piano

References

Live video albums
2003 video albums